A Majority of One is a 1961 American comedy film directed by Mervyn LeRoy, starring Rosalind Russell and Alec Guinness. It was adapted from the play of the same name by Leonard Spigelgass, which was a Broadway hit in the 1959-1960 season, starring Gertrude Berg and Cedric Hardwicke.

Plot
Bertha Jacoby (Rosalind Russell), a Jewish widow, is convinced by her daughter Alice Black (Madlyn Rhue) to move from Brooklyn, New York to Tokyo in order for Bertha to be closer to her along with her husband Jerry Black (Ray Danton), now stationed at the U.S. Embassy in Tokyo. Her feelings about the Japanese with regards to her son's death in World War II start to change on board the ship to Tokyo, where she meets Koichi Asano, a Japanese Buddhist and businessman (Alec Guinness), who also lost a spouse and two children in the war. The two share a bond over lives, their families, and their faiths, which develops into a romance. When she announces to her family of Asano's courtship, her daughter and son-in-law object to the idea of an interracial marriage.

Cast
 Rosalind Russell as Bertha Jacoby
 Alec Guinness as Koichi Asano
 Ray Danton as Jerry Black
 Madlyn Rhue as Alice Black
 Mae Questel (credited as Mae Questal) as Essie Rubin
 Marc Marno as Eddie
 Gary Vinson as Mr. McMillan
 Sharon Hugueny as Bride
 Frank Wilcox as Noah Putnam
 Francis De Sales as American embassy representative
 Yuki Shimoda as Mr. Asano's Secretary
 Harriet MacGibbon as Lily Putnam
 Alan Mowbray as Captain Norcross  (This was Mowbray's final film role.)
 George Takei as Mr. Asano's majordomo
Maria Tsien as Mr. Asano's Maid (uncredited)

Production
Guinness went to Japan days prior to production started to study the culture, the people and their customs. He went under heavy makeup to play the role. Russell had misgivings about the role due to her believing that Berg deserved the part (though studio head Jack Warner refused due to doubts over Berg's viability), but she decided to portray the role after hearing that she could co-star with Guinness. The two called each other and agreed mutually to do it. Both actors were Catholic, different from what they portrayed in the film.

Reception
A. H. Weiler, film critic for The New York Times, called the film a "truly heartwarming and entertaining affair," and opined that it was a "truthful, satisfying work largely because the combination of funny and apt dialogue and the dedicated cast give it dignity," largely due to Russell's convincing performance as a "self-sufficient Brooklyn dowager," although he thought that "Mr. Guinness still appears to be closer to London than to Tokyo."

A review in the trade magazine Variety declared "Leonard Spigelgass’ brew of schmaltz and sukiyaki is an outstanding film...Russell’s Yiddish hex-cent, though at times it sounds like what it is – a Christian imitating a Jew – is close enough to the genuine article. Guinness becomes Japanese through physical suggestion and masterful elocution."

However, in his 1994 autobiography, George Takei, a Japanese-American actor who later found fame playing Mr. Sulu in the original Star Trek, recalls that while playing a minor role in A Majority of One, he was "shocked" at the "grotesquely offensive" latex make-up applied to Guinness's eyes, and by the "incomprehensible gibberish" of his Japanese lines, producing a disappointing and "disastrous" performance.

In February 2016, Andrea Passafiume, reviewing the film for Turner Classic Movies, wrote: "A Majority of One is a true hidden gem with warmth, humor and a message of tolerance and compassion that remains just as relevant today as it was in 1961."

Awards and nominations

See also
 List of American films of 1961
 Whitewashing in film

References

External links

 
 

1961 films
1961 comedy films
1960s English-language films
American films based on plays
Films directed by Mervyn LeRoy
Films featuring a Best Musical or Comedy Actress Golden Globe winning performance
Warner Bros. films
Best Musical or Comedy Picture Golden Globe winners
Jews and Judaism in fiction
Films set in Tokyo
American comedy films
Films about interracial romance
Japan in non-Japanese culture
1960s American films